Prince of Darkness is a 1987 American supernatural horror film, written and directed by John Carpenter, and starring Donald Pleasence, Victor Wong, Jameson Parker, and Lisa Blount. The second installment in what Carpenter calls his "Apocalypse Trilogy"—which began with The Thing (1982) and concludes with In the Mouth of Madness (1994)—the film follows a group of quantum physics students in Los Angeles who are asked to assist a Catholic priest in investigating an ancient cylinder of liquid discovered in a monastery, which they come to find is a sentient, liquid embodiment of Satan.

Plot
A Catholic priest invites quantum physicist Professor Howard Birack and his students to join him in the basement of a Los Angeles monastery belonging to "The Brotherhood of Sleep", an old order who communicate through dreams. The priest requires their assistance in investigating a mysterious cylinder containing a swirling green liquid. Among the thirteen academics present are wise-cracking Walter Fong, demure Kelly, the highly-strung Susan Cabot, and lovers Brian Marsh and Catherine Danforth.

They decipher an ancient text found next to the cylinder which describes the liquid as the corporeal embodiment of Satan. The team also learns Jesus Christ was an extra-terrestrial who was executed for heresy after trying to warn the people of Earth about the vessel in which Satan was trapped. The liquid is then discovered to be sentient. The academics use a computer to analyze the books surrounding it, and find that they included differential equations. Over a period of two days, small jets of liquid escape from the cylinder. Members of the group exposed to the liquid become possessed by the entity and attack the others. The first victim is Susan, who begins killing off the others one by one, after which they too become possessed. Anyone who attempts to flee the monastery is killed by the growing mass of enthralled homeless people who have surrounded the building.

Professor Birack and the priest theorize that Satan is actually the offspring of the "Anti-God", an even more powerful force of evil bound to the realm of anti-matter. The survivors find themselves sharing a recurring dream (a tachyon transmission sent as a warning from the future, "year one-nine-nine-nine") showing a shadowy figure emerging from the front of the church. The hazy transmission changes slightly with each occurrence of the dream, revealing progressively more detail. The narration of the transmission each time instructs the dreamer that they are witnessing an actual broadcast from the future.

Walter, trapped in a closet, witnesses the possessed bringing the cylinder to a sleeping Kelly. It opens itself and the remaining liquid transfuses into Kelly’s body, causing her to become the physical vessel of Satan: a gruesomely disfigured being, with powers of telekinesis and regeneration. Kelly attempts to summon the Anti-God through a dimensional portal using a mirror, but the mirror is too small and the effort fails.

While the rest of the team is occupied fighting the possessed, Kelly finds a larger wall mirror and draws the Anti-God's hand through it. Catherine, the only one free to act, tackles Kelly, causing both of them to fall through the portal. The priest then shatters the mirror with an axe, trapping Kelly, the Anti-God, and Catherine in the other realm. Catherine is seen briefly on the other side of the mirror reaching out to the portal before it closes. Immediately, the possessed die, the street people wander away, and the survivors (Brian, Walter, Professor Birack, and the priest) are rescued.

Brian has the recurring dream again, and now sees that Catherine (apparently possessed) is the figure emerging from the church. Brian awakens and finds Kelly, seemingly Satan's vessel, lying in bed with him. This is shown to be another dream, and he awakens screaming. Rising, he approaches his bedroom mirror, hand outstretched, the final scene going black just before he touches the mirror.

Cast

Analysis
Film critic John Kenneth Muir suggests that Prince of Darkness serves as a parable for the AIDS epidemic that was at its peak during the time the film was made. Throughout the film, demonic possession is depicted as something that is transmitted like a communicable disease, via fluid passed between people. Muir goes on to note a number of references to homosexuality in the film, namely regarding the character of Walter, who makes several statements implying that he is gay (although he briefly flirted with Lisa, one of the female characters). In particular, Muir notes a sequence in which Walter, attacked by a number of possessed women while trapped inside a closet, emerges and flees. In addition to this, Muir writes that the film "pointedly asks some rather big questions about human nature, our existence, and the universe at large."

Production
Prince of Darkness was shot in Los Angeles, California in 30 days. Carpenter became inspired while researching theoretical physics and atomic theory. He recalled, "I thought it would be interesting to create some sort of ultimate evil and combine it with the notion of matter and anti-matter." This idea, which would eventually develop into the screenplay for Prince of Darkness, was to be the first of a multi-picture deal with Alive Pictures, where Carpenter was allocated $3 million per picture and complete creative control.

Executive producer Shep Gordon was also manager to singer Alice Cooper, and suggested Cooper record a song for the film. Carpenter also cast Cooper as one of the homeless zombies. Cooper allowed the "impaling device" from his stage show to be used in the film in the scene where Cooper's character kills Etchinson. The song Cooper wrote for the film, also titled "Prince of Darkness", can be heard briefly in the same scene playing through Etchinson's headphones.

Carpenter cast people that he had worked with previously, including Victor Wong, Dennis Dun and Donald Pleasence. It was Peter Jason's first film for Carpenter, and he would afterward become a Carpenter regular. The film was shot with wide-angle lenses, which combined with anamorphic format to create a lot of distortion.

Carpenter wrote the screenplay but was credited as "Martin Quatermass," which, along with the name of Professor Birack's institution (Kneale University), was an homage to British film and television writer Nigel Kneale and his best-known character, Bernard Quatermass. The story features elements associated with Kneale, including a confrontation with ancient evil (Quatermass and the Pit and The Quatermass Conclusion), messages from the future (The Road), and the scientific investigation of the paranormal (The Stone Tape). Kneale was displeased with the homage, fearing that viewers might believe that he had something to do with the film.

The poster for Prince of Darkness was created and designed by Henry Rosenthal, who worked for print production vendor Rod Dyer. According to Carpenter in the DVD audio commentary, the post-production was done at the Walt Disney Studios in Burbank, California.

In an interview with Michael Doyle in the November 2012 issue of Rue Morgue, John Carpenter revealed how he created the eerie dream sequences in Prince of Darkness that feature a shadowy figure emerging from a church doorway. Carpenter first shot the action of the figure (played by actor Jessie Ferguson) with a video camera and then "re-photographed it on a television set" in order to give the image a peculiar, dislocated feeling that also appeared as if it was being filmed live. Doyle also reminded Carpenter that the director himself provided the disembodied voice that narrates each dream.

Soundtrack

Release

Critical reception
On review aggregator Rotten Tomatoes, Prince of Darkness holds an approval rating of 61%, based on 38 reviews, and an average rating of 6.2/10. Its consensus reads, "Prince of Darkness has a handful of chillingly clever ideas, but they aren't enough to put John Carpenter's return to horror at the same level as his classic earlier outings." On Metacritic, the film has a weighted average score of 50 out of 100, based on 10 critics, indicating "mixed or average reviews".

In his review for the Washington Post, Richard Harrington wrote, “At one point Pleasence vows that 'it's a secret that can no longer be kept.' Here's another: The Prince of Darkness stinks.' It too deserves to be shut up in a canister for 7 million years". Liam Lacey, in his review for The Globe and Mail, wrote, “There is no character really worth caring about, no sympathy to any of these characters. The principal romantic couple, Jameson Parker and Lisa Blount, are unpleasant enough to create an unfortunate ambivalence about their eternal destinies”. In his review for the New York Times, Vincent Canby called the film a "surprisingly cheesy horror film to come from Mr. Carpenter, a director whose work is usually far more efficient and inventive."  Nigel Floyd in Time Out gave a positive review of the film, calling Prince of Darkness "engrossing" and adding "the claustrophobic terror generated by fluid camerawork and striking angles" leads "to a heart-racing climax".

In 2004, Jim Emerson wrote that Prince of Darkness was an undervalued horror film: "What makes me goose-pimply about Prince of Darkness is its goofy-but-ingenious central conceit and its truly surrealistic imagery, some of which could have sprouted out of Buñuel and Dali's Un Chien Andalou."

Like most of Carpenter's films, Prince of Darkness went on to have a cult following.

The dream sequence narrations have been sampled by a variety of musicians and producers over the years, including DJ Shadow on his debut Endtroducing..... LP.

Accolades
In 1988, the film was nominated for a Saturn Award for best music, and won the Critics Award at the Avoriaz Fantastic Film Festival.

Home media
On September 24, 2013, the film was released by Scream Factory on Blu-ray and DVD. On February 18, 2019 the film was released on 4K by StudioCanal. In January 2021, Scream Factory issued their own 4K release of the film, which includes both a 4K UHD disc and a Blu-ray disc.

References

Sources
Boulenger, Gilles. John Carpenter Prince of Darkness. Los Angeles: Silman-James Press (2003). .
Doyle, Michael. "The Essence of Evil", Rue Morgue #128 (November 2012), p. 16-22.

External links

 
 
  
 
 
 
 Prince of Darkness at theofficialjohncarpenter.com
 Prince of Darkness at Trailers from Hell

1987 films
1987 horror films
American supernatural horror films
Latin-language films
Films directed by John Carpenter
Films with screenplays by John Carpenter
Apocalyptic films
Films scored by John Carpenter
Films scored by Alan Howarth (composer)
Films set in the future
Films set in Los Angeles
Films shot in Los Angeles
Religious horror films
Films about dreams
Films about spirit possession
The Devil in film
American zombie films
1980s supernatural horror films
Films set in 1999
Films about quantum mechanics
1980s English-language films
1980s American films